7-Chloro-α-methyltryptamine (7-Cl-AMT) is a tryptamine derivative with stimulant effects, invented in the 1960s. It is a weak monoamine oxidase inhibitor but its pharmacology has not otherwise been studied by modern techniques, though several closely related compounds are known to act as serotonin–dopamine releasing agents and agonists of the 5-HT2A receptor.

See also 
 5-Chloro-AMT
 5-Chloro-DMT
 5-Fluoro-AMT
 5-Fluoro-AET
 5-Fluoro-DMT
 6-Fluoro-AMT
 7-Methyl-DMT
 7-Methyl-AET
 7F-5-MeO-MET
 O-4310

References 

Designer drugs
Psychedelic tryptamines
Serotonin receptor agonists
Chloroarenes